Stephen Martin Stephens  (born June 1939) is a retired British judge. He was called to Bar in 1963 and took Silk in 1982. He was appointed as a Recorder in 1979, as a Circuit Judge in 1986 and then appointed as a Judge of the Central Criminal Court in 1999. He is a former member of the Parole Board of England and Wales.

Cases
In January 2009 Stephens presided over the trial of James Hopkins accused of murdering Ms Browne, a transsexual prostitute based in Marylebone. Hopkins was found guilty of the murder of Browne who had a number of celebrities among her clients. Prosecuting Hopkins, barrister for the prosecution commented: "There is some evidence that Ms Browne did have some clients who were in the public eye." The court heard that Hopkins' palm prints were found on the Sun and another publication in a plastic bag on the floor. Browne lived in a flat at 6b Gosfield Street, Marylebone, London, and advertised for clients in phone kiosks and newspapers including the Sunday Sport. Police launched a murder inquiry after Browne's body was found in her central London flat in W1 on 28 February 1997.

See also

 Criminal justice
 Judiciary of England and Wales

References

1955 births
English barristers
Members of Gray's Inn
Living people
Lawyers from London
20th-century English judges
21st-century English judges
International criminal law scholars